Ephraim Mashaba (born 6 August 1950) is a South African former soccer player and manager.

Career
Mashaba managed Vaal Reef Stars until the club was relegated from the South African top-tier.

He managed the South Africa national team, but was sacked from the team on the eve of the 2004 African Cup of Nations in January 2004 after previously having been suspended.

A month later, in February 2004, Mashaba took over Black Leopards.

He became manager of the Swaziland national team in May 2008.

He was appointed as manager of the South Africa national team for a second time in July 2014. He was suspended for disciplinary reasons in November 2016, and was sacked for misconduct in December 2016. He failed in his attempt to appeal the decision.

In January 2019 he became manager of Witbank Spurs. After a poor run of form, he was sacked on 3 April 2019.

References

1950 births
Living people
South African soccer managers
South Africa national soccer team managers
Orlando Pirates F.C. players
Moroka Swallows F.C. players
South African soccer players
Black Leopards F.C. managers
Expatriate football managers in Eswatini
Eswatini national football team managers
Sportspeople from Soweto
Association football defenders
2015 Africa Cup of Nations managers